Ada Wells (née Pike, 29 April 1863 – 22 March 1933) was a feminist and social worker in New Zealand.

Biography

Ada Pike was born near Henley-on-Thames, South Oxfordshire, England. Her parents emigrated to New Zealand with their four girls and one boy in 1873, arriving on the Merope in Lyttelton on 31 October of that year. She attended Avonside School from 1874, and Christchurch West High School in 1876, where she then worked as a pupil-teacher from 1877 to 1881.

Wells attended Canterbury College. In 1884, aged 20, she married Harry Wells, the cathedral organist and choirmaster. Twelve years Ada's senior, with a violent temper and fondness for alcohol, he was a poor financial manager. Ada's marital experience – where she was, at times, the family breadwinner – strengthened her belief that women should have economic independence.

Wells was a teacher at St. Albans School which was situated in a poor working class part of Christchurch. With her husband's help, Ada put on concerts in aid of the school prize fund. In 1892, Ada, pregnant, sought two months' leave of absence. The North Canterbury Education Board was inclined to grant this. However, Ada was opposed by the headmaster, James Speight, who wrote a long letter on 'the delinquencies of Mrs. Wells'. Rather than being granted leave of absence, Ada was dismissed.

In the 1880s, working within the Women's Christian Temperance Union New Zealand (WCTU NZ), Ada was active in the women's suffrage movement. While Kate Sheppard was the public face of the WCTU NZ campaign for the enfranchisement of women, Ada was an organiser. In 1893 New Zealand became the first self-governing country in the world in which all women had the right to vote in parliamentary elections.

In 1892, Ada established the Canterbury Women's Institute, an organization similar to the Women's Franchise Leagues in other parts of the country; for many years, she was president. In 1896 when the National Council of Women of New Zealand was formed, she became its first secretary.

From 1899 to 1906, Ada was an elected member of the Ashburton and North Canterbury United Charitable Aid Board. She was associated with the Prison Gate Mission for the rehabilitation of ex-prisoners. A founding member of the National Council of Women in 1896, she was the first secretary.

She had three daughters and a son. Harry Wells died in 1918. Ada died in Christchurch on 22 March 1933 and was buried at the Waimairi Cemetery.

The Ministry for Culture and Heritage now offers an Ada Wells Memorial Prize for Undergraduate Students.

Activism

As a member of the National Peace Council, Ada spoke out strongly against conscription and war, and helped World War I conscientious objectors.

Wells advocated a meatless diet and was a vegetarianism activist. At the 1897 conference of the National Council of Women, Wells promoted an ovo-lacto vegetarian diet. She authored magazine articles supportive of naturopathy and vegetarianism. Wells was an anti-vaccinationist and opposed vivisection.

She also campaigned for the corollary to women's suffrage, women's right to stand for Parliament. This was granted in 1919, though no woman was elected until 1933. A member of the Labour Party, Ada was, between 1917 and 1919, the first woman member of the Christchurch City Council.

See also
List of suffragists and suffragettes
Timeline of women's suffrage
Women's suffrage in New Zealand

References

1863 births
1933 deaths
Anti-vivisectionists
New Zealand anti-vaccination activists
New Zealand suffragists
University of Canterbury alumni
People from Christchurch
Christchurch City Councillors
Burials at Waimairi Cemetery
People educated at Christchurch West High School
New Zealand Labour Party politicians
Vegetarianism activists
English emigrants to New Zealand